Patrick Harmon was a 50-year-old African-American man fatally shot from behind by police officer Clinton Fox in Salt Lake City, Utah, on August 13, 2017. The shooting took place after Harmon was pulled over by an officer for riding a bicycle without proper lighting. The incident led to protests in Salt Lake City, some organized by Black Lives Matter.

Incident
Harmon had been pulled over by police officer Kris Smith for bicycling without a red rear light. Officers tried to arrest Harmon after discovering an outstanding warrant. Harmon attempted to flee the scene and was chased by the police, at which point officers said he turned towards them with a knife and was shot. The shooting of Harmon by Fox was recorded by police body cameras. Police also stated that Harmon verbally threatened them prior to the shooting saying "I’ll cut you".

Harmon was tasered by Smith while or when on the ground after being shot by Fox.

Aftermath

The police and district attorney's office initially declined to release the body camera footage, prompting public protest in Salt Lake City.

In early October 2017, some of the body camera footage was released, and the district attorney in Salt Lake City announced the decision not to file charges against the officers. The district attorney claimed that Harmon posed a threat to the officers. Critics have argued that the video footage from the scene does not show such a threat because he was running away when he was shot. A local Black Lives Matter representative said that the community wanted the district attorney to resign, or else they would respond with protesting marches.

Salt Lake City police Sgt. Brandon Shearer claimed that the officers had used police de-escalation tactics. Fox was criticized by a Black Lives Matter representative, for failing to de-escalate the situation.

In October 2017, following further public protests, the district attorney asked the FBI to review his decision not to prosecute the police involved.

See also
 Biking while black
 List of killings by law enforcement officers in the United States
 Shooting of Abdullahi Omar Mohamed

References

2010s in Salt Lake City
2017 controversies in the United States
2017 in Utah
August 2017 events in the United States
Black Lives Matter
Deaths by person in Utah
Filmed killings by law enforcement
Law enforcement in Utah
African Americans shot dead by law enforcement officers in the United States
Taser
Salt Lake City Police Department
Cycling safety